Kaningi or Kaning'i may be,

Kaningi people
Kaningi language